Silesian Beskids Landscape Park is a protected area (Landscape Park) in southern Poland, established in 1998, covering an area of  in the Silesian Beskids mountain range. Administratively the Park is contained within Silesian Voivodeship.

Landscape parks in Poland
Silesian Beskids
Cieszyn Silesia
Protected areas of the Western Carpathians
Parks in Silesian Voivodeship